HMS Tribune was a British T class submarine built by Scotts, Greenock. She was laid down on 3 March 1937 and was commissioned on 17 October 1939. HMS Tribune was part of the first group of T class submarines.

Career
Tribune started the war with operations in the North Sea and off the Scandinavian coast.  She had a number of patrols, attacking an unidentified German submarine and merchant, the U-56, the German tanker Karibisches Meer and the German merchant Birkenfels, all without success.

In the Mediterranean, she damaged the French merchant Dalny, which was beached to prevent her from sinking, and then damaged the now beached Dalny the next day.  She also torpedoed and damaged the German tanker Präsident Herrenschmidt, and attacked the Italian merchant Benevento, but failed to hit her.

HMS Tribune and crew starred in the 1943 British wartime propaganda film "Close Quarters", 'playing' HMS Tyrant on a North Sea patrol off Norway. She survived the war, was sold for scrap in July 1947, and was broken up in November 1947 by Thos. W. Ward, of Milford Haven. Her pennant number N76 was 'posthumously' re-used for an unnamed submarine in the 1951 film "Appointment with Venus", taking British troops out to the Channel Islands to rescue a pregnant pedigree cow from the German occupiers.

References

External links

 

British T-class submarines of the Royal Navy
Ships built on the River Clyde
1938 ships
World War II submarines of the United Kingdom